Shakhtyorsk (Tōro) is a town in Uglegorsky District of Sakhalin Oblast, Russia, located on the western coast of the Sakhalin Island,  northwest of Yuzhno-Sakhalinsk, the administrative center of the oblast. Population:

Etymology
The name of the town derives from the Russian word "" ("miner"), referring to the black coal production in the surrounding area.

History
It was founded after 1905 as Tōro, in the region then known as the Karafuto Prefecture of Japan. After the Soviet Union gained control over the southern part of the Sakhalin Island in August 1945, it became part of Sakhalin Oblast. It was granted town status and given its present name in 1947.

Administrative and municipal status
Within the framework of administrative divisions, it is, together with four rural localities, incorporated within Uglegorsky District as the town of district significance of Shakhtyorsk. As a municipal division, the town of district significance of Shakhtyorsk is incorporated within Uglegorsky Municipal District as Shakhtyorskoye Urban Settlement.

Economy
The town's economy relies mainly on black coal mining, which supports a power station.

References

Notes

Sources

Cities and towns in Sakhalin Oblast